Scaevatula pellisserpentis is a species of small predatory sea snail, a marine gastropod mollusk in the family Clavatulidae.

Description
The shell grows to a length of 8 mm. Its whorls are sinistral.

Distribution
This marine species is endemic to São Tomé and Príncipe.

References

 Gofas, S. (1990) Scaevatula n. gen., a sinistral clavatuline turrid from West Africa. Archiv für Molluskenkunde, 120, 11–22

External links
 
 Holotype in the MNHN, Paris

pellisserpentis
Endemic fauna of São Tomé and Príncipe
Invertebrates of São Tomé and Príncipe
Gastropods described in 1990
Taxonomy articles created by Polbot